Dharm Jagaran Samiti (DJS) is  an Indian organisation for conversion of non-Hindus to Hinduism, with a coordinating committee called "Dharam Jagaran Samanvay Samiti". It is a right-wing Hindu nationalist organisation.

The Dharm Jagaran Samiti is considered a member of the Sangh Parivar group, an umbrella term for Hindu nationalist organisations led by the Rashtriya Swayamsevak Sangh (RSS). The goal of the Dharma Jagran Committee is to return to Hinduism those people whose ancestors were forcibly converted to Islam during the Mughal period. They also oppose Christian missionaries, who are active in the country by converting Dalit Hindus to Christianity, which they allege is done by giving various inducements.

References

External links 

1964 establishments in Delhi
Hindutva
Hindu nationalism
Hindu movements
Hindu organizations
Hindu organisations based in India
Hindu new religious movements
Political masks
Volunteer organisations in India
Right-wing populism in India
Sangh Parivar
Anti-communist organizations
Anti-communism in India
Hindu revivalists
Anti-Islam sentiment in India